Poleskovo is a rural locality (a village) in Borisoglebskoye Rural Settlement, Muromsky District, Vladimir Oblast, Russia. The population was 10 as of 2010.

Geography 
Poleskovo is located 62 km northeast of Murom (the district's administrative centre) by road. Zakharovo is the nearest rural locality.

References 

Rural localities in Muromsky District